Kampong Speu may refer to:

Kampong Speu Province, a central province of Cambodia
Kampong Speu (town), the capital of Kampong Speu Province, now officially Chbar Mon District
Kampong Speu (National Assembly constituency)